Palak is one of the 51 union councils of Abbottabad District in the Khyber Pakhtunkhwa Province of Pakistan.

References

Union councils of Abbottabad District

fr:Palak